Pediasia desertellus is a species of moth in the family Crambidae described by Julius Lederer in 1855. It is found in Portugal and on Sicily, as well as in Mauritania, Algeria, Israel, Jordan, Asia Minor, Lebanon, Syria, Iraq, Uganda and Iran.

References

Moths described in 1855
Crambini
Moths of Europe
Moths of Africa
Moths of Asia